Cesar Ricardo Bressani Castignoli (28 September 1926 – 30 January 2015) was a Guatemalan food scientist. Born in Guatemala City, he received a bachelor of science in chemical engineering degree from the University of Dayton in 1948. In 1951, he received a master's degree from Iowa State University. In the same year, Bressani returned to Guatemala where he worked at the Institute of Nutrition of Central America and Panama, INCAP. In 1952, he received a scholarship from the Rockefeller Foundation to study biochemistry at Purdue University, where Bressani obtained his Ph.D. in 1956. Afterwards, he reincorporated to the INCAP, this time as the Head of the Division of Agricultural Sciences and Food until 1993.

In 1983, Bressani became one of the 42 founding members of the Third World Academy of Sciences, known today as The World Academy of Sciences. In the 1990s, Bressani was the editor-in-chief of the journal Archivos Latinoamericanos de Nutrición. He was also an associate editor of the Food and Nutrition Bulletin. In 1992, he arrived to the Universidad del Valle de Guatemala, and in 1998, he founded the Center for the Studies of Food Science and Technology. Bressani wrote more than 300 publications in many scholarly international journals.

Bressani performed an investigation on practical solutions to nutritional problems within the population of Guatemala and the rest of Central America. His experiments led to the creation and production of Incaparina, a nutritional supplement based on a mixture of corn flour, soy flour, cottonseed meal, and Torula yeast. This supplement was intended to be primarily served in the form of gruel.

References

Further reading

External links 
 UNICEF campaign 'Te Toca' (It's your turn)
 Corinne A. Pernet, “Between Entanglements and Dependencies: Food, Nutrition, and National Development at the Central American Institute of Nutrition (INCAP),” In Sönke Kunkel, Corinna Unger und Marc Frey, eds., International Organizations and Development, 1945-1990, Palgrave Macmillan, 2014, p.101-125.

1926 births
2015 deaths
Food scientists
Guatemalan scientists
Grand Crosses of the Order of the Quetzal
Albert Einstein World Award of Science Laureates
University of Dayton alumni
Iowa State University alumni
Purdue University alumni
Guatemalan people of Italian descent
Foreign associates of the National Academy of Sciences